Alpha Zeta Omega ( or AZO) is a co-ed, pharmaceutical professional fraternity founded on December 19, 1919.  It was originally known as the Dead Men's Club.

Origins 
Alpha Zeta Omega was founded in Philadelphia, at the Philadelphia College of Pharmacy and Science, which is now called the University of the Sciences in Philadelphia. The leader and originator of this group was Ephraim G. Sless. The original members (also known as fraters) were:
 Harry Althouse
 Lawrence Rosenfeld
 Morris Arkans
 Abe M. Bernstein
 David Champaine 
 David L. Dyen
 Stanley Rosenfeld
 Al Rosenfield
 Louis Snyder
 David Schwartz
 Morris Shuman
 Ephraim G. Sless
 Joshua Zimskind

These eleven men secretly started a pharmaceutical fraternity they dubbed the Dead Men's Club.  Soon after its founding, Harry Althouse was added, and as its members then numbered twelve, the group was often referred to as "The Dozen".  Later, Dr. Lawrence Rosenfeld, an eminent Philadelphia bacteriologist, also became a member, but the name of "The Dozen" persisted.  Because of strenuous opposition to the formation of new organizations at the Philadelphia College of Pharmacy and Science by older fraternities and clubs, the newly formed Dead Men's Club would exist as a secret society for several years.

Purpose 
Alpha Zeta Omega was formed for the purpose of academic support; the original stated goal was to ensure 100% graduation of its members.  Members participated in a structured series of quizzes, designed and executed by the members most proficient in the particular subject under discussion. These frequent study sessions resulted in bringing together the social life of the members.  In 1921, the Dead Men's Club boasted 100% graduation of its 13 members.  In addition to the original goal of "100% graduation" the purpose of the Fraternity is now designated chiefly as "to spread the spirit of Fraternalism, Brotherly Love, Friendship and Good Will towards Mankind."

Fraternal government 
The original constitution of AZO was drawn up by A.M. Bernstein and D.L. Dyen. Stanley Rosenfeld was elected the first "Supreme Directorum" (President) of the Fraternity. The original 13 members termed themselves the Alpha chapter. The Supreme Chapter, consisting of Supreme Officer and delegates from subordinate chapters, meet regularly twice a year in January and July.  At the 1925 Convention in Newark, NJ the Philadelphia Alumni chapter was chartered, which nullified the charter of the Alpha chapter. The "Alpha" fraters therefore became charter members of the Alumni chapter of Philadelphia.

The fraternity is organized by chapters, each representing a specific pharmacy school or geographic area. chapters may be formed by undergraduates, alumni, and in some instances are "mixed"—containing both undergraduate and graduate members.

The government has alternative names for their officers which follow:

Directorum - President
Sub-Directorum - Vice President
Signare - Secretary
ExCheque - Treasurer
Bellarum - Sergeant of Arms

History

Early years 
After the "Dead Men's Club" graduated, the group held its first official gathering at the home of Abe M. Bernstein. It was at this time decided to change the name of the organization to "Alpha Zeta Omega Fraternity".  As it was the custom at the time to use Greek letters to designate fraternities, AZO was renamed such because:
 Alpha—the first letter in the Greek alphabet, representing the beginning of time
 Zeta—a mnemonic of the founders names, a symbol of the link between the creation and eternity
 Omega—the last letter of the Greek alphabet, was taken to represent the end of time.
In 1922 Alpha Zeta Omega Fraternity, Supreme Chapter, was officially incorporated under the laws of the State of Pennsylvania.

Notable events
In 1937, the Ohio River Floods caused considerable damage to pharmacies owned by several members. An emergency session of the fraternity was called and a support drive was held to assist those members' businesses that were damaged or destroyed in the flood. In 1938, plans to offer insurance to the members of the Fraternity were adopted, and when finalized, $100,000 worth of insurance was written.

In June 1946, AZO presented funds for the pharmacy of the Hadassah Memorial Hospital in Palestine. This was part of $15,000 pledged by AZO to build a pharmacy building at the hospital.

In 1956, AZO took on as its cultural program, the task of raising money for the Hebrew University in Israel.  The stated goal was to raise $100,000 in 3 years, however, the fraternity surpasses its goal and raised $103,000 in just two years.

In 1961, a book titled "40 Years of AZO" was published, detailing the history of AZO.  It was a 360-page, hard-cover printed volume, distributed to fraters and chapters nationwide, as well as pharmacy school libraries nationwide.  Additional historical publications would follow, outlining the history of AZO from 1960 to 1970, and then again from 1970 to 1980.

In the early 1970s, AZO began admitting women as members for the first time, and thus became a co-ed fraternal organization.

In 1976, the founder of AZO, Ephraim G. Sless, died.  In honor of their late founder, the membership began a campaign to establish scholarships across the USA and in Israel.

After the events of September 11, 2001, AZO started a project to benefit the Dean Street Heroes Fund, N.Y.  Fire Dept., Engine Co. 219.

After the devastation caused by Hurricane Maria to Puerto Rico, where one of AZO's chapters resides, a project was started to benefit the rebuilding of the territory.

Conventions
As the fraternity began to grow in its early years, it became necessary to hold a yearly convention. The first such affair took place at the Hotel Walton, Philadelphia in June 1922, with E. Fullerton Cook, Chairman of the Pharmacopoeia Revision Committee, as guest and toastmaster.  At times there have been as many as 3 conventions per year.  Currently, two meetings are held each year—a National Convention in July and a Regional Convention in January.

Ladies' Auxiliary
In 1939, a Ladies Auxiliaries was established at several chapters for the wives of AZO fraters, and at the Detroit Convention in 1940, a National Auxiliary was founded.

Publications 
 The AZOan—yearly publication of AZO, started in December 1922.  It was originally title "Hazy-O".  The first editor was Si Sless.
AZO Apothecary—newsletter published quarterly containing reports from national officers and subordinate chapters.

Regalia
 AZO Pin—designed by A. M. Bernstein, D.L. Dyen, M Shuman, and E.G. Sless
 Recognition Pin (1924)
 AZO Fraternity Shield (1924)

Collegiate chapters 
Alpha:	First chapter. Philadelphia chapter that was converted into the Philadelphia Alumni as the undergraduates became the Beta chapter. Now known as Philadelphia Alumni chapter
Beta: 	Philadelphia College of Pharmacy (inactive)
Gamma: 	Temple University
Delta: 	McGill University
Epsilon: 	Rutgers University 
Zeta:	Columbia University
Eta: 	University of Cincinnati
Theta: 	Western Reserve University in Cleveland
Iota: 	Arnold and Marie Schwartz College of Pharmacy
Kappa: 	University of Maryland School of Pharmacy
Lambda: 	University of Louisville/ Louisville Alumni
Mu: 	Pittsburgh Alumni
Nu: 	University of Connecticut/ Connecticut Alumni
Xi: 	Fordham University
Omicron: 	Detroit Institute of Technology
Pi: 	George Washington University/Howard University
Rho: 	The St. Louis College of Pharmacy/ St. Louis Alumni
Sigma: 	The University of Toledo
Tau: 	Massachusetts College of Pharmacy and Health Sciences
Upsilon: 	Northeastern University in Boston/ Boston Alumni
Phi: 	Wayne State University/ Detroit Alumni
Chi: 	California Alumni
Psi: 	Nova Southeastern University College of Pharmacy/ Miami Alumni
Omega: 	Hebrew University of Jerusalem
Beta Alpha: 	Milwaukee Alumni
Gamma Psi: 	Phoenix Alumni
Delta Alpha: 	Chicago Alumni
Epsilon Alpha: 	West Florida Alumni
Epsilon Chi: 	University of Missouri–Kansas City School of Pharmacy
Zeta Phi: 	University of Iowa
Eta Upsilon: 	St. John's University College of Pharmacy
Theta Alpha: 	Ohio Northern University
Theta Beta: 	Ohio State University
Nu Mu: 	University of New Mexico in Albuquerque
Omicron Alpha: 	Ferris State University
Omicron Beta: 	Florida Tri-County Alumni
Omega Chi: 	Virginia Commonwealth University School of Pharmacy/ Virginia Alumni
Pi Rho: 	University of Puerto Rico College of Pharmacy
Theta Gamma:   The University of Findlay
Delta Tau: 	Western New England University
Lambda Nu: 	University of New England
Rho Iota: University of Rhode Island

Awards
 Directorum's Cup—Established June 1926, awarded a subordinate chapter having the excellent standing each year.
 Newspaper Cup—Awarded to subordinate chapters for chapter publications
 Meritorious Award—Awarded to a member with "long and distinguished activity on behalf of the Fraternity"
 Supreme Undergraduate Award—Awarded to exceptional undergraduates one a year at conventions
 Achievement Medal—Awarded to a person (not necessarily a member) for "long and meritorious service to the Profession of Pharmacy"
 Order of the Double Star—Awarded to a member "who attain positions of respect and importance within the Profession of Pharmacy"
 E. G. Sless Award—Awarded to a member "who have given years of long and distinguished service to AZO on the chapter level"
 S. I. Sless Award—Awarded to an undergraduate member for undergraduate service to AZO

See also 
 List of Jewish fraternities and sororities
 Professional fraternities and sororities
 Rho Chi, co-ed, pharmacy honor society

References

Professional pharmaceutical fraternities and sororities in the United States
Student organizations established in 1919
1919 establishments in Pennsylvania
Historically Jewish fraternities in the United States
Jewish organizations established in 1919